Kristine Marie Larson is an American academic. She is Emeritus Professor of Aerospace Engineering at the University of Colorado Boulder. Her research considers the development of algorithms for high-precision Global Positioning System (GPS) data analysis. She was the first to demonstrate that GPS could be used to detect seismic waves. She was awarded the 2015 European Geosciences Union Christiaan Huygens Medal.

Early life and education 
Larson was born in Southern California. Her father Valdemar F. Larson, "Swede", worked on the Deep Sea Drilling Project. She studied engineering science and mechanics at Harvard University and graduated in 1985. Larson joined the University of California, San Diego for her doctoral studies, and earned a PhD in geophysics at the Scripps Institution of Oceanography in 1990. Her dissertation evaluated the accuracy of the Global Positioning System (GPS) and was supervised by Duncan Agnew. She was a member of the technical staff at the Jet Propulsion Laboratory, where she worked with the team that developed the GPS infrared positioning system, GIPSY.

Research and career 
Larson was appointed to the faculty at the University of Colorado Boulder in 1990. She developed new algorithms for the analysis of Global Positioning System (GPS) data. She used GPS to identify plate velocities, boundary zone deformation and ice sheet motion. She completed a visiting professorship at the Goddard Space Flight Center. Larson started to develop GPS for new applications in geoscience in 2000. She led a team of scientists that was the first to demonstrate that GPS could be used to detect seismic waves in 2003. Her approach was used to evaluate earthquake triggering near the Denali rupture zone. GPS seismology is now used routinely in earth surveillance, including in the monitoring of tsunamis as well as in seismic source models.

Larson has also worked on hydrogeodesy, as well as advising the US Federal Government on geodetic infrastructure. Larson noticed that there were errors caused by the interference of GPS signals, which correlated with the water content in the surfaces close to the receiving antenna. She showed that geodetic GPS receivers can be used to detect the water content of soil, as well as the depth of snow, snow water equivalent, and vegetation water content. She first demonstrated this capability in 2012, when she transformed a GPS network to be capable of interferometric reflectometry (GPS IR). GPS-IR was used in the Earthscope Plate Boundary Observatory.

Larson also showed that it is possible to measure sea level changes, which allows the monitoring of subsidence and ground motion caused by earthquakes. These GPS receivers act as tide gauges, and can be tied to a terrestrial reference frame. She used them to monitor tidal levels in Kachemak Bay, and found that GPS was in good agreement with records from traditional tide gauges. Larson showed that the strength of the GPS signal is correlated to the density of volcanic ash.

In 2015 she became the first woman to win the European Geosciences Union Christiaan Huygens Medal. In 2017 she became a Humboldt Fellow at GFZ German Research Centre for Geosciences. She became an Emeritus Professor at the University of Colorado Boulder in 2018.

Awards and honours 

 2006: Japan Society for the Promotion of Science Award, University of Tokyo
 2006: American Geophysical Union Geodesy Award
 2007: American Geophysical Union Bowie Lecture
 2011: 150th Jubilee Visiting Professor, Chalmers University of Technology
 2011: American Geophysical Union Fellow
 2013: University of Colorado Boulder Faculty Assembly Research Award
 2014: Fulbright Specialist, Mohammed V University at Agdal
 2014: Prince Sultan Bin Abdulaziz International Creativity Prize for Water
 2015: European Geosciences Union Christiaan Huygens Medal
 2017: Humboldt Foundation Research Prize
 2017: Chalmers University of Technology Honorary Doctorate
 2017: University of Colorado Boulder Governor's Award for High Impact Research
 2018: University of Colorado Boulder  Research Lecture
 2019: Visiting Scholar, Earthquake Research Institute, University of Tokyo
 2020: Fulbright Research Scholar, University of Tasmania

Selected publications

References 

Women geophysicists
Geodesists
American geologists
American geodesists
American geophysicists
University of Colorado Boulder faculty
Scripps Institution of Oceanography alumni
Harvard University alumni
Year of birth missing (living people)
Writers from California
Living people